Laurence Stanley Payne (5 June 1919 – 23 February 2009) was an English actor and novelist.

Early life
Payne was born in London. His father died when he was three years old, and he and his elder brother and sister were brought up by their mother, a Wesleyan Methodist in Wood Green, London. He attended Belmont School and Tottenham Grammar School, leaving at 16 to take a clerical job. After training at the Bristol Old Vic Theatre School in 1939, he was exempted from war service as a conscientious objector on condition that he went on tour with the Old Vic during the war.

Career

Actor
Payne made his professional debut at the Old Vic theatre in 1939 and remained with the company for several years. He then performed at the Chanticleer and Arts theatres in London, also directing and broadcasting for the first times during this period.  At Stratford-on-Avon he played, among other parts, Romeo in Peter Brook's 1947 production.

After more work at London theatres, he played leading roles at the prestigious Bristol Old Vic, and after that rejoined the London Old Vic company. At the Embassy Theatre in London he played Hamlet.

His film credits include: The Trollenberg Terror (aka. The Crawling Eye), Vampire Circus, The Tell-Tale Heart and Ben-Hur. His television credits include: Z-Cars, Moonstrike, Thriller (1 episode, 1974), The Sandbaggers, Airline, Telephone Soup and Tales of the Unexpected. See him also as Capulet in a 1976 version of Romeo and Juliet.

He appears in three Doctor Who serials: The Gunfighters, The Leisure Hive and The Two Doctors, playing a different role in each. Perhaps his most famous role was as TV's Sexton Blake (1968–71) on ITV in Britain. It was while filming an episode of Sexton Blake that he lost the sight in his left eye during rehearsal of a sword fighting scene with actor Basil Henson, following a hard sword blow against the side of his head.  Peter Moffatt took him straight away to Moorfields Eye Hospital, and Payne was told that, if he could lie still for a week without moving his head, his retina would join up again so preserving his sight. Instead of doing this, Payne went back to work, got hit in a fist fight, and so lost his sight in that eye.

Writer
After retiring from acting, Payne continued to concentrate on writing crime/detective novels. His 1961 novel The Nose on my Face was filmed as Girl in the Headlines (1963). By 1993, he had published 11 novels, and he has been called "one of the great humorists of the world of crime fiction".

Personal life and death
Payne was an enthusiastic oil painter, a self-taught pianist and an excellent fight director. In later years he worked regularly on radio, but in the 1990s he contracted septicaemia and there was subsequent brain damage. Suffering from vascular dementia, he spent the last three years of his life in a nursing home near Berwick-upon-Tweed.  He was married twice.

Selected filmography
 A Matter of Life and Death (1946) - Prosecuting Counsel (uncredited)
 Train of Events (1949) - Richard (segment "The Prisoner-of-War")
 Glad Tidings (1953) - Clive Askham
 The Face of Love (1954), BBC TV movie adaption of Troilus and Cressida in the leading role as Troilus
 Ill Met by Moonlight (1957) - Manoli
 Dangerous Exile (1957) - Lautrec
 A Tale of Two Cities (1958) - President of Tribunal (uncredited)
 The Trollenberg Terror (1958) - Philip Truscott
 Ben-Hur (1959) - Joseph (uncredited)
 The Tell-Tale Heart (1960) - Edgar Marsh
 The Singer Not the Song (1961) - Pablo
 The Third Alibi (1961) - Norman Martell
 The Queen's Guards (1961) - Farinda
 The Court Martial of Major Keller (1961) - Major Keller
 Barabbas (1961) - Disciple
 Crosstrap (1962) - Duke
 Mystery Submarine (1963) - Lt. Seaton
 Vampire Circus (1972) - Mueller
 The Message (1976) - Of one major role (voice)
 Romeo and Juliet (1976) (TV) - Capulet

References

External links
 
 The Stage website
 Obituary in The Guardian
 Obituary in The Daily Telegraph
 Obituary in The Times
 Obituary in The Independent

English conscientious objectors
English male film actors
English Methodists
English male stage actors
English male television actors
People educated at Tottenham Grammar School
People from Wood Green
English male Shakespearean actors
1919 births
2009 deaths
English male novelists
20th-century English novelists
Deaths from vascular dementia